Australian rules football in Germany is currently played by six clubs within the Australian Football League of Germany (AFLG) the governing body. Three clubs run metro leagues. The Dresden Wolves compete in the CAAFL of the Czech Republic and some other formative clubs play on an ad hoc basis within Germany.

History 
The Frankfurt Redbacks and Munich Kangaroos were founded in 1995 and had been playing since 1996. The AFLG was officially created in 1999, but the two clubs only played occasional matches against each other for the first few years until the formation of the Berlin Crocodiles and the Hamburg Dockers made the possibility of a national league a reality. The German home and away season began in 2003 with these four clubs, Munich winning the premiership.

In 2004 the Düsseldorf Lions (formed in 2002) joined the AFLG, the league having a five-club structure for the following two seasons.

In 2006, a new French side from Strasbourg, the Kangaroos, entered the German league to experience regular league play. The Strasbourg club played under the nickname the "Black Devils" in the German league to avoid a name clash with Munich. At roughly the same time, the Düsseldorf club rebranded to become the Rheinland Lions to reflect a shared home between Düsseldorf and nearby Köln (Cologne).

In 2007 the French team, Strasbourg Kangaroos withdrew from the league to regain strength, leaving five clubs and a 10-game league season plus additional tournaments.

In 2008 a sixth team was formed in Stuttgart, nicknamed the Emus. They joined regular league play in division two in 2009.

Divisional Structure 2009
At the end of the 2008 season, the playing standard of the league had progressed to a stage where it was difficult for a new or developing club to compete against the established sides.  This was particularly evident in the struggles of the Berlin Crocodiles to remain competitive.  Conversely, the larger clubs were seeing an increase in players numbers and were in need of a venue for their reserve players.  These factors, combined with the entrance of the Stuttgart Emus into the AFLG, saw the creation of a second division to the league in 2009.

During this season, the league's six clubs fielded eight teams in total across both divisions.  Division 1 featured the Frankfurt Redbacks, Hamburg Dockers and the firsts from Munich Roos and Rheinland Lions.  Division 2 featured the Berlin Crocodiles, Stuttgart Emus, and the seconds from Rheinland and Munich.

In 2010 the league decided to return to a one-division competition, however with Hamburg declining to field a side, just the five clubs competed in the home-and-away season.  Hamburg returned to the main league in 2011, bringing it back to 6 clubs.

Premierships and Grand Finals 
 2003 Munich Kangaroos (no grand final)
 2004 Frankfurt Redbacks (- Munich Kangaroos 51-25, Berlin)
 2005 Munich Kangaroos (- Frankfurt Redbacks 86-4, Frankfurt)
 2006 Munich Kangaroos (- Rheinland Lions 55-48, Munich)
 2007 Rheinland Lions (- Munich Kangaroos 85-37, Cologne)
 2008 Rheinland Lions (- Munich Kangaroos 66-61, Munich)
 2009 Rheinland Lions (- Munich Kangaroos 87-51, Frankfurt)
 2010 Munich Kangaroos (- Rheinland Lions 85-31, Berlin)
 2011 Rheinland Lions (- Berlin Crocodiles 75-24, Stuttgart)
 2012 Munich Kangaroos (- Rheinland Lions 54-40, Cologne)
 2013 Hamburg Dockers (- Rheinland Lions 68-55, Hamburg)
 2014 Rheinland Lions (- Munich Kangaroos  55-44, Fürstenfeldbruck)
 2015 Hamburg Dockers (- Munich Kangaroos  84-43, Cologne)
 2016 Munich Kangaroos (- Berlin Crocodiles 139-27, Frankfurt, 10 September 2016)
 2017 Berlin Crocodiles (- Munich Kangaroos 142-54, Dresden, 16 September 2017)
 2018
 2019 Hamburg Dockers (- Berlin Crocodiles 60-41, Cologne, 7 September 2019)
 2020 no season
 2021 Berlin Crocodiles (- Hamburg Dockers 91-49, Berlin, 23 October 2021)

League History

National team  
The German national Australian rules football team is nicknamed the Black Eagles, taking the name from the symbol of the Coat of arms of Germany, the Bundesadler (federal eagle).

The first appearance of an all-German national team was in 2006, with the team competing in a tri-nations series against Denmark and Sweden, losing both of their first "test-level" matches.

In 2007 the German National Team competed in the Tri-Nations series for the second year running against Sweden and Denmark, claiming their first test-level victory over Sweden in Berlin, on 7 July 2007.

The team is yet to make an appearance at the Australian Football International Cup, as the AFLG has stated that the costs involved would be better spent in local development.  Informal German national AFL teams have also at times competed under the names 'the Blitz' and 'the Eagles'.

The 2007 EU Cup was also hosted by Germany and took place on 15 September in Hamburg with Germany losing the final game against Sweden.

On 11 June of 2011 the Black Eagles defeated the French national team in a friendly game 83:19. The match was held in Paris.

Clubs 
All in all there are six clubs in Germany that have a regularly training, a certain club structure and are participating or aiming to do so in a professional competition such as the AFLG.

Frankfurt Redbacks  
Formed in Frankfurt by Malte Schudlich in 1995, the Redbacks are one of the two oldest Australian rules football clubs in Germany and were a founding member club of the AFLG. They originally wore black jumpers with a vertical red stripe on the front, this has now been changed to red jumpers with a stylised redback spider logo. Their homeground is the Frankfurt Ostpark.

Munich Kangaroos  
The Munich Kangaroos were founded in Munich by Greg Langley in 1994 and was the only German club, except for Frankfurt, formed before the year 2000.

The Roos made an early attempt to start a league based around Munich, named the German Australian Rules Football Association, beginning with two teams -- the Bayern Blues and Munich Whites. This league did not eventuate, with the Roos and Redbacks coming together to form the AFLG in 1999. Munich have played in the AFLG premiership season since the true home and away setup began in 2003.

The Munich Roos wear blue and white, the traditional colours of both the AFL North Melbourne Kangaroos and the state of Bavaria (Bayern) of which Munich is the capital.

In the late 1990s/early 2000s, the Roos would also host the Oktoberfest Cup, which was held during the Oktoberfest.

Bayern League

After the return of the AFLG to a one-league competition in 2010, the Munich Roos found themselves in the position of having a large player group but only limited playing opportunities, especially for players new to the game.  Hence a new 9-a-side competition was conceived, dubbed the Bayern League. The league had three foundation clubs: the Pasing Hawks, Schwabing Saints and Sendling Blues, who play home-and-away either on Thursday evenings or Saturday afternoons on non-AFLG game weeks.

Premierships

 2011  Schwabing Saints (- Sendling Blues, 102-21)
 2010  Sendling Blues (no Grand Final)

Berlin Crocodiles  
The Crocodiles were formed in Berlin during 2002 as the third Aussie Rules club in Germany, and have played in the AFLG since its home and away seasons began in 2003. The Crocodiles wear green jumpers with a gold yoke and a gold crocodile logo. Their home games were originally played in the Treptower Park, although they are now at Schiller Park, where they hosted the 2004 and 2010 AFLG Grand Final tournament. In the 2011 season most homegames will be played at the Maifeld next to the Olympic Stadium.

Hamburg Dockers  
The Hamburg club formed in 2003 by Fabian Cordts, joining the AFLG in that season. The club considered a number of names, including the Hamburg Foxes, but being located in Germany's largest port city eventually settled on the name Hamburg Dockers. Ironically, they wore the jumpers of the Fremantle Dockers' biggest traditional rivals, the West Coast Eagles, for the first two years of existence, finally receiving a set of Fremantle's all-purple alternative jumpers for the 2005 season.

The Hamburg Football Club went through its first two seasons in the AFLG winless, but started their 2005 campaign in fine fashion with their first-ever win - a 155-23 away drubbing of the Düsseldorf Lions, becoming a strong footballing outfit over the course of their third season.

After a year off in 2010, the Dockers came back for the 2011 AFLG Season. A rebuilt team, plenty of new talent at the old turf in Stadtpark with 2 big victories at the end of the 2011 season defeating the Frankfurt Redbacks and Stuttgart Emus.

Rheinland Lions  
The Lions were formally established for AFLG league play in 2004 in Düsseldorf under the name Düsseldorf Lions. Previously, they had competed on an irregular basis, their first appearance being a tournament called the Rhein Cup on 31 August 2002 against Berlin Crocodiles and Frankfurt Redbacks. They also hosted the 2004 CEAFL Championships.

As of late 2005, the Lions changed their name to the Rheinland Lions – as a large proportion of their playing squad live in the nearby cities of Cologne or Bonn rather than Düsseldorf. They have also for this reason started playing their home games in Cologne. Cologne and Düsseldorf have a traditional rivalry and the name change to a neutral title may help avoid these rivalries in regional recruiting efforts.

For their first match they wore the black rugby jumpers from the Düsseldorf Dragons Rugby union Club. Their current jerseys are red and white, featuring a black, encircled lions head.

In 2015 the Lions became the first German Team to compete in the AFL Europe Champions League. They managed to become 2nd best just beaten by the West London Wildcats.

Stuttgart Emus 
The Emus were created in 2008, with players taking part in matches with other German teams. Their first appearance as a stand-alone club was in the 2008 AFLG finals tournament, where they played a match against the 5th-placed German side, Berlin. They established themselves in 2009's second division, coming in third place and showing some strong games, such as against later champion Berlin when they lost only by one goal. The consolidation continued again in season 2010, where they came in fourth place, beating the oldest German AFL team - Frankfurt - twice. The Emus wear the colors green and white.
Since 2018 the Emus and the Freiburg Taipans play together as the Zuffenhausen Giants.

Dresden Wolves 
The team was founded in 2013 by Christoph Odenthal and played in the Prague League for two years before joining AFLG in 2015.

Freiberg Taipans 
Since 2018 the Taipans and the Stuttgart Emus play together as the Zuffenhausen Giants.

Further Clubs 
At the moment there are three further clubs in formation, that yet do not participate in the AFLG:
 Leipzig Quokkas
 Heidelberg Knights
 Kiel Koalas

Former Club 
 Leverkusen Wombats

See also 
Australian rules football
Australian rules football in Europe

References

External links 
Official AFLG Website
Frankfurt Redbacks
Munich Kangaroos
Berlin Crocodiles
Hamburg Dockers
Rheinland Lions

Ger
Sport in Germany by sport
Ger